Grand Central (formerly The Pallasades Shopping Centre, previously Birmingham Shopping Centre) is a shopping centre located above New Street railway station in Birmingham, England that opened in 1971 as Birmingham Shopping Centre. In 1989 it was largely refurbished, and reopened 17 September 1990 as The Pallasades Shopping Centre. The centre underwent a mass redevelopment in 2014, opening 24 September 2015 as Grand Central. It is currently owned by Hammerson and CPPIB, having been acquired from Birmingham City Council in January 2016 for £335m. When coupled with the Bullring (to which it is connected via a pedestrian overpass, branded as ‘LinkStreet’) it forms the United Kingdom's largest city centre based shopping centre, styled as Bullring & Grand Central.

History
The original centre was built in 1971 as part of the reconstruction of Birmingham New Street station below. It was known as the Birmingham Shopping Centre before being renamed as The Pallasades.

Redevelopment
As part of the Birmingham New Street station Gateway Plus redevelopment, Grand Central underwent a major overhaul, which included a 6 year long programme of enabling works by Birmingham demolition contractor Colemans, formerly Coleman & Co. The mall has been redesigned with a Texlon ETFE atrium roof as centrepiece, and is home to over 60 stores across 500,000 sq ft with John Lewis as main anchor tenant. Many of the shops, restaurants and cafés are new to the city including Cath Kidston, The White Company, Kiehls, Giraffe and Tapas Revolution. It reopened in September 2015 along with the modernised Birmingham New Street station.

The shopping centre has lent its name to the adjacent tram stop that opened in May 2016.
John Lewis announced in 2020 that their store would not reopen after being closed during the COVID-19 restrictions.

Grand Central was selected as a filming location for the 2023 film Mission: Impossible – Dead Reckoning Part One.

References

External links
Bullring & Grand Central official website

Buildings and structures in Birmingham, West Midlands
Shopping centres in the West Midlands (county)
Shopping malls established in 1971
1971 establishments in England